Pertti Kurikan Nimipäivät (PKN) were a Finnish punk rock band, formed in 2009 in a charity workshop for adults with developmental disabilities. They are the main focus of the 2012 Finnish documentary film The Punk Syndrome. In 2015, they qualified for the finals of Uuden Musiikin Kilpailu, which they later won; they represented Finland in the Eurovision Song Contest 2015 but got knocked out in the semi-final. The group disbanded in December 2016 when guitarist Pertti Kurikka turned 60 years old and retired from playing punk rock.

History

Formation (2004–2012) 
Pertti Kurikan Nimipäivät began in a workshop run by Lyhty, a charity for adults with developmental disabilities. In 2004, Pertti Kurikka, the future guitarist of the band, met organizer Kalle Pajamaa of Lyhty. Pajamaa, who remains manager of the band today, noticed Kurikka's potential and sought to establish a band based upon him. They worked on the band's formation over the next five years, and in 2009 the band made its debut.

In 2009, Finnish director Pekka Karjalainen sought music performed by people with disabilities for the film Vähän kunnioitusta, which tells the story of a young girl with a learning disability aspiring to live an independent and normal life. Pertti Kurikan Nimipäivät is featured in the film with their first-ever demo: "Kallioon!". The song became a hit, and the band soon discovered that they had a following outside the circle of disabled people.

In 2012, their fame grew as they were the main subject of The Punk Syndrome, a Finnish documentary film. The documentary, depicting the band's story from its outset to their first European tour, earned them a following in Scandinavia and Germany.

2014: Charity concert with Mr. Lordi
In 2014, the band performed in a charity concert with Mr. Lordi of the Finnish rock band, Lordi. The charity concert was held in Rovaniemi on 23 May 2014 for benefit of the mentally-disabled community of Mozambique and the Lapland Metkat Association. Pertti Kurikan Nimipäivät's bold and unusual take on Eurovision has been compared to that of Lordi, Finland's 2006 Eurovision entry and the winner of that year's contest.

2015: Eurovision Song Contest 2015
The band entered Uuden Musiikin Kilpailu, Finland's national selection for Eurovision Song Contest 2015 with the song "Aina mun pitää". They entered the contest in order to raise awareness for people with Down Syndrome. On 7 February 2015, the band was one of the three acts from the first-semi finals to advance to the finals. On 28 February 2015, the band won Uuden Musiikin Kilpailu 2015, thereby becoming Finland's representative for the Eurovision Song Contest in Vienna, Austria in May 2015. PKN was the first punk band to compete in Eurovision.

PKN's Eurovision bid was noticed by the international media and covered, for instance, by the BBC, The Guardian, VICE and the Associated Press.

Posti issued a PKN stamp on 11 May 2015, eight days before the first Eurovision semi-final in Vienna.

On 26 December 2016, the group performed their final concert, intended to mark Kurikka's 60th birthday, upon which he had long planned to retire from the music industry. The group disbanded after the show.

In 2017, the group re-united for a one-off charity concert.

Members
The band had four members: guitarist Pertti Kurikka, vocalist Kari Aalto, bassist Sami Helle and Toni Välitalo on drums. All members have either Down syndrome or autism.

Pertti Kurikka
Pertti Kurikka (born 26 December 1956 in Vihti) is the band's guitarist. He writes the music for the band and also some of the lyrics. He has released a spoken word cassette and a book of horror stories under the pseudonym Kalevi Helvetti. He also edits a zine called "Kotipäivä" ("Home Day").

Kurikka has been listening to punk for 30 years, but also listens to many other music genres ranging from classical to schlager and disco to children's music. He visits church regularly and retired from the music industry at the age of 60. He can also play the street organ.

Kari Aalto
Kari Aalto (born 25 May 1976 in Tampere)  is the singer of the band and also writes most of their lyrics. He is a school friend of Kurikka. He has his own talk show on Finnish local radio station Bassoradio. He can play drums, bass and keyboards. He loves motorcycles, American cars, women and alcohol. He listens to 1950s and 1960s rock, psychobilly, rockabilly, surf, reggae, doowop and also rap, heavy metal and folk. He does not listen to punk in his spare time, as nowadays it is his profession.

Sami Helle
Sami Helle (born ) plays bass in the band and also sings background vocals. As a child he lived in Boston, New York City, Paris and Antibes, so he can speak fluent English. He is politically active as a member of the Finnish Central Party and also as activist of Me itse, an organization of disabled people. He wishes to become a municipal councillor of Helsinki and later a member of the parliament.

Helle independently released a solo album, Blue Moments, under the name Sam Heat. The sound is more gentle, a musical departure from the punk sound of PKN. Helle wrote the music and lyrics for the entire album.

Toni Välitalo
Toni Välitalo (born  or ) is the drummer and also the youngest member of the band. He started playing drums at the age of six. In addition to punk, he plays other genres such as jenkka, blues and mazurka. His favourite music is Finnish schlager.

Kalle Pajamaa
Disability director Kalle Pajamaa (born 1979) is the band's concert manager and arranges the songs for the band. He is affectionately called the fifth member of the band.

Discography

Albums

Compilation albums

Extended plays

Singles

References

External links

Pertti Kurikan Nimipäivät Uuden Musiikin Kilpailu 2015 page 
English article about the band in Finnish Broadcast Company's news page

Disability in the arts
Autism in the arts
Finnish punk rock groups
Musical groups established in 2009
Musical groups disestablished in 2016
Musical groups from Helsinki
People with intellectual disability
Finnish people with disabilities
Disability organisations based in Finland
Eurovision Song Contest entrants of 2015
Eurovision Song Contest entrants for Finland